('Collapsing New Buildings') is a German experimental music group, formed in West Berlin in 1980. The group is currently composed of founding members Blixa Bargeld (lead vocals; guitar; keyboard) and N.U. Unruh (custom-made instruments; percussion; vocals), long-time contributor Alexander Hacke (bass; vocals), plus Jochen Arbeit (guitar; vocals), and Rudolph Moser (custom-built instruments; percussion; vocals), who both joined the line-up in 1997.

One of their trademarks is the use of custom-built instruments, predominantly made out of scrap metal and building tools, and noises, in addition to standard musical instruments. Their early albums were unremittingly harsh, with Bargeld's vocals shouted and screamed above a din of banging and scraping metal percussion. Subsequent recordings found the group's sound growing somewhat more conventional, yet still containing many unorthodox elements.

History

1980s
On 1 April 1980,  made their first appearance, at the Moon Club in West Berlin. This first lineup featured Beate Bartel and Gudrun Gut, Blixa Bargeld, and N.U. Unruh. The two female members, Bartel and Gut, left the band after a short period and founded Mania D. Shortly thereafter, Alexander Hacke (alias Alexander von Borsig), a sound technician and multi-instrumentalist who was 15 years old at the time, joined the band and became a longtime member.

In 1981, percussionist F.M. Einheit (from the Hamburg band ) joined  and they released their first LP,  ("Collapse"), a mixture of rough punk tunes and industrial noises. The industrial noises were obtained from self-made music machines, electronics, and found objects such as metal plates. The live performances with Einheit in the 1980s included much metal banging and destruction on stage.

During their first German tour, Mark Chung (previously the bass player with ) joined the group of musicians. This lineup lasted nearly 15 years.

In 1983,  recorded their second album,  ("Drawings of Patient O.T."). The title came from a 1974 book by Leo Navratil, describing the drawings of Oswald Tschirtner. The band also appeared as guest performers on Fad Gadget's "Collapsing New People" 7" single's B-side track Spoil The Child, recorded at Hansa Tonstudio, Berlin in November 1983.

Also in 1983, Bargeld joined the band The Birthday Party (featuring Nick Cave and Mick Harvey) as a guitarist. That group soon disbanded, but Bargeld became a longtime member of one of the bands that sprang from it, Nick Cave and the Bad Seeds (again featuring Cave and Harvey).

In 1984, with guests including Genesis P-Orridge, Stevo Pearce, Frank Tovey and others, played a show titled The Concerto for Voices and Machinery at the ICA in London. After 20 minutes the venue halted the show when the band began to dig through the venue's stage with drills and jackhammers. 1984 also saw the first release of a best-of and rarities compilation, Strategies Against Architecture '80–'83.

The band's next album,  ("Half Man") in 1985, may be seen as a developmental breakthrough. Musical structure became more evident, and Bargeld's lyrics and, especially, his singing changed. He moved from shouted words and phrases toward organized, poetic melodies.

The band played a show in Vancouver, Canada, to kick off its third North American tour. The performance was sponsored by the German Goethe Institute as part of the German contribution to Expo 86. Also scheduled to appear were Test Dept and Skinny Puppy, though not everyone was able to play.

On the tour, the group's experimental and improvised live performance style occasionally caused difficulties with venue management and law enforcement. A performance at The Palladium in Manhattan ended after an improvised pyrotechnics display. The band ignited lighter fluid in a couple of metal pans, and management stopped the performance and cleared the venue.

The one-hour film Halber Mensch (1986) by Sōgo Ishii documents 's visit to Japan in 1985.

1990s
In 1990, the band tried something completely new, recording the soundtrack for East German playwright Heiner Müller's play  ("The Hamlet Machine") for East German radio . The band image of  changed: Blixa Bargeld, formerly wearing punk/industrial style clothes, appeared at the live concerts in a suit.

1991 also saw the release of the double album, a best-of and rarities album, Strategies Against Architecture II. This collection included a musical setting of Heiner Müller's piece  ("Explosion of a Memory" or "Description of a Picture").

In Vienna, May 1992,  performed at The Academy of Fine Arts' 300th anniversary in a show by Erich Wonder,  ("The eye of the typhoon").

The next album, Tabula Rasa (1993), was an important turning point in the band's history, the music becoming softer and containing more electronic sounds.

In 1993, the band was booked to support U2 during the European leg of the Zoo TV Tour, but were thrown off the stage and off the tour when a band member threw an iron bar into the booing crowd.

F.M. Einheit, who contributed much to the music and sound of the band, left the band a short time later in 1995, during the recording of the  album, at least partially because of a conflict with Bargeld. Roland Wolf replaced them on bass guitar and keyboards only a short time before dying in a car accident in 1995.

A short time later, the band released the album  ("Ending New") in 1996. The title is wordplay on the band's own name (i.e. ""). The song Stella Maris – a duet between Bargeld and Hacke's then-wife, singer Meret Becker – became quite famous; a world tour followed the release. During this time, Jochen Arbeit and Rudolph Moser (both members of ) joined the band: Arbeit on guitar, and Moser on drums, with Hacke switching to bass guitar. This lineup, accompanied by Ash Wednesday on keyboards for live concerts, has held ever since.

Alternative Press included Einstürzende Neubauten in their 1996 list of "100 underground inspirations of the past 20 years."

2000s

From 27 March to 23 May 2000,  celebrated their 20th birthday with a "20th anniversary tour", playing in the Columbiahalle, Berlin on its birthday, 1 April, and released the album Silence Is Sexy, followed by a world tour. 2001 also saw the release of another double best-of and rarities album, Strategies Against Architecture III.

Since 2001,  albums and web projects have been partially produced and supported by Bargeld's wife, Erin Zhu, who also serves as webmaster of 's website.

In 2002,  began work on a new album without the backing of a record label, relying instead upon fan ("supporter") participation in an experiment of a type of Street Performer Protocol combined with an internet community and touches of the patronage system. An exclusive Supporter Album No. 1, and the Airplane Miniatures EP following, were made available in 2003.

Bargeld left Nick Cave and the Bad Seeds in 2003. In order to go on tour, the band reneged on the idea of creating a supporter-only album, and cooperated with Mute Records to go on tour and release Perpetuum Mobile in 2004. Air sounds, such as blowing the plastic pipes with an air compressor, were greatly explored and used for this album: the working title of the album was, for a long while,  ("Change of air").
A half-hour documentary about the supporters project, was made by Ste van Holm and Dihcar, and is available on YouTube.

The live shows of the Perpetuum Mobile Tour were recorded by the band's sound engineers, then burned on CDRs with individual pictures of each show taken by Danielle de Picciotto and sold directly after the concerts; numerous "official" live albums were created during this tour as a result.

In November 2004, the band went on a mini-tour, which included a supporters-only performance at Berlin's . The performance was filmed and coordinated by Danielle de Picciotto and Ian Williamson and released on the exclusive supporter's DVD at the end of Phase II.

The band also started a new project called  in early 2005. The first CD, was sent out in May 2005, and was also available for download to  subscribers. The  project was a "line of releases intended to give the band an outlet for more experimental impulses and exploration."  albums were released roughly every 3 months.

The second  CD,  ("Incredible noise"), was finished on 15 August, and shipped out (as well as posted for download) shortly after.

Phase II of the  Supporter's project finished in August 2005, and the official site was taken down on 20 September. The supporter album  ("Plot of Land") and DVD (containing footage from the November 2004  performance in Berlin) was shipped in early October 2005.

Phase III of the Supporter's project started on 10 February. On 25 February, the fourth part of the  series, Redux Orchestra versus Einstürzende Neubauten, was completed. One of the new additions to Phase III started in March 2006 was a piece-by-piece album, Jewels, finally finished in August 2007.

Danielle de Picciotto, Alexander Hacke's wife and longtime companion, released the DVD documentary  - On tour with .org which describes the supporter project in detail, having interviewed international supporters during the Perpetuum Mobile tour in 2004.
 
 No. 5  ("Cassettes"), finished 15 May with release scheduled for 31 May. At the same time,  ("Everything of any use"), an album that had been in the work since Phase 2, were completed. The album consists of rare live tracks, handpicked by 6 supporters of Phase 2 and mixed by Boris Wilsdorf. This was quickly followed by  No. 6  ("Piano music"), released on 31 August.

 No. 7  ("Voice Remainders") was released on 2 December, consisting of vocal experiments, vocal recordings, and manipulations of voice recordings, enriched with leftover instrumental tracks made with polystyrene, electronic pulses, Hammond organ, bass guitar, and metal percussion.

It was announced on the band's website that it would be undertaking a "small (mostly) UK tour" in April 2007, but playing in Hannover on 22 April beforehand.  No. 8  ("Wine spirits") was released on 6 April, forming the final instalment of the  series.

A new commercial album was made available later in the year, the first release since 2004's Perpetuum Mobile. The new album,  ("All open again"), was released in 2007 without the backing of a label, a move the band had intended to make with Perpetuum Mobile. Fans who were part of the paid EN community at neubauten.org received access to an album with the same tracks plus a number of extra songs, and an optional DVD about the making of the album. The band also filmed a video for "Nagorny Karabach". They spent the first half of 2008 touring for the album, playing 32 dates in 19 European countries.

2010s 

 celebrated its 30th anniversary in 2010 with a tour through Europe. An American leg was also planned, but on 29 November 2010 the band announced the cancellation of all U.S. dates due to visa scheduling problems.

Silence Is Sexy was reissued on 1 July 2011.

In May 2014, the band announced on their official website that it was back in the studio working on new material. It also announced dates for live shows to be held in November 2014. The album Lament was released on 7 November.

2020s 

In November 2019, the band announced on their official website that they would release a new studio album in 2020 with an accompanying tour. The album, titled Alles in Allem, was released on 15 May 2020.

In January 2020, the band announced a tour across North America.

The album Alles in Allem (all in all) was released with 10 songs totalling 44 minutes and 6 seconds, taking a new spin on their previous music with a gothier twist with a “chill” style while keeping the presence of heavy electronic elements while maintaining their strange sound.

Members

Current
Blixa Bargeld – lead vocals, electric guitar, slide guitar, keyboards, organ, piano, additional instruments  
N.U. Unruh – special built instruments, percussion, backing vocals  
Alexander Hacke – bass guitar, acoustic guitar, vibraphone, additional instruments, vocals  
Jochen Arbeit – electric guitar, slide guitar, additional instruments, backing vocals  
Rudolph Moser – special built instruments, percussion, backing vocals

Other personnel

Ash Wednesday – keyboards, electronics (touring musician since 1997)
Boris Wilsdorf – sound engineer
Erin Zhu – executive producer, webmaster of neubauten.org and wife of Blixa Bargeld. Erin is a graduate of Stanford Graduate School of Business, where she was a Sloan Fellow. Erin Zhu and Blixa Bargeld are featured in Designing Media, a 2010 Bill Moggridge book about 37 of the most influential people in the media industry.
Ari Benjamin Meyers – frequent collaborator, with Redux Orchestra and on piano
Danielle de Picciotto – documented the Perpetuum Mobile and  tours and Palast der Republik performance, coordinated Jewels documentation and released a documentary  – on tour with neubauten.org; also the wife of Alexander Hacke

Previous members
Beate Bartel – bass (original member, only in the band for a short time in 1980)
Gudrun Gut – keyboards (original member, only in the band for a short time in 1980)
Mark Chung – bass, vocals (1981–1994)
Roland Wolf – keyboards, bass (replaced Mark Chung in 1995)
F.M. Einheit – percussion, vocals (real name: Frank Martin Strauß, 1981–1995)

Timeline

Band name
The band name is usually translated into English as "Collapsing New Buildings". ("new buildings") is a general term referring to buildings constructed in Germany after 1945. Due to the extensive destruction throughout Germany during the Second World War, and the extensive rebuilding thereafter,  constitute a very familiar element of German cities.

The band's name attracted unexpected attention when on 21 May 1980, not two months after the band's forming, the roof of the Berlin Congress Hall famously collapsed, killing one person and injuring many. The resulting media attention surrounding the collapse of the German-American icon gave the meaning of their name a new dimension.

Band logo
 

The Einstürzende Neubauten logo is an appropriation by the band of an archaic ideogram or petroglyph. It appears to be a stick figure with a circled dot or sol as its head. The provenance of the logo has been attributed to the sacred ring of Stonehenge, or possibly to an Olmec Native American cave, and most directly in one source to ancient Chinese origins.  

The logo is placed on all of the band's official products, such as vinyl/CD/DVD covers, posters, artwork, and memorabilia. The logo is copyrighted by the band. Blixa Bargeld said that by  re-purposing a Toltec petroglyph, whose meaning was purposefully undefined, as their band logo, it would be "filled" with meaning later.

Singers Henry Rollins, Joakim Thåström, Gareth Liddiard and Alexis S.F. Marshall all have the  logo tattooed.

The Monas Hieroglyphica glyph created in 1564 by John Dee which resembles the band's logo.

Discography

Cassette
  (1980)

Studio albums
  (1981)
  (1983)
  (1985)
  (1987)
  (1989)
 Tabula Rasa (1993)
  (1996)
 Silence Is Sexy (2000)
 Perpetuum Mobile (2004)
  (2007)
 Lament (2014)
  (2020)

EPs
 Thirsty Animal ( & Lydia Lunch), 1982
 Interim (1993)
 Malediction (1993)
 Total Eclipse of the Sun (1999)

Soundtracks
  (play, 1991)
  (play, 1996)
 Berlin Babylon (documentary film, 2001)

Singles
  (1980)
  (1981)
 Thirsty Animal (1982) (with Lydia Lunch & Rowland S. Howard)
 "Yü-Gung" (1985)
  (1985)
 "Feurio!" (1989) (3-inch disc)
 "Nag Nag Nag/Wüste" (1993) (3-inch disc available only with book )
 "Stella Maris" (1996)
 "NNNAAAMMM - Remixes by Darkus" (1997)
 "Total Eclipse of the Sun" (2000)
 "Perpetuum Mobile" (2004) (download-only release)
 "Weil Weil Weil" (2007) (download-only release)
 "Ten Grand Goldie" (2020) (download-only release)

Collections
 Stahldubversions (1982)
 Strategies Against Architecture '80–'83 (1984)
 Tri-Set (1994)
 Ende Neu Remixes (1997)
 Strategies Against Architecture II (1991)
 Strategies Against Architecture III (2001)
 Kalte Sterne -early recordings- (2004)
 Strategies Against Architecture IV (2010)
 Greatest Hits (2016)

Live albums
 1981/1982 Livematerial (1982)
 2X4 (1984) (live album)
 09-15-2000, Brussels (2001)
 Gemini (2003)
 Perpetuum Mobile Tour (2004)
 04-01-2004, Amsterdam (2004)
 10-29-2004, Reggio Emilia (2004)
 25th Anniversary Tour (2005)
 04-07-2005, Brussels (2005)
 04-22-2007, Hannover (2007)
 04-24-2007, London (2007)
 Palast der Republik (2007)

Neubauten.org Supporters Project
 Supporter Album No. 1 (2003)
 Airplane Miniatures (2003)
  (2005)
  (2006)
 Jewels (2006–2007)
  (2018)

Musterhaus Series
  (2005)
  (2005)
 Solo Bassfeder (2005)
 Redux Orchestra versus Einstürzende Neubauten (2006)
 Kassetten (2006)
  (2006)
  (2006)
  (2007)

Appeared on
 Hardware (1990)
 Heat (1995)
 The Island of Dr. Moreau (1996)
 The Life of David Gale (soundtrack) (2002) 
 The Collector (soundtrack) (2009)

Videos
 Halber Mensch (1985)
 Liebeslieder (1993)
 Stella Maris (1996)
 20th Anniversary Concert (2000)
 Listen with Pain: 20 Years of Einstürzende Neubauten (2000)
 On Tour with Neubauten.org (2004)
 Grundstück (DVD, 2005)
 Palast der Republik (DVD, 2006)
 Elektrokohle (von wegen) (2009)

See also
 Industrial music
 Industrial percussion

References

Further reading
 
 
 M. Bullynck and I. Goerlandt: The Semiotics of 's 'X' . In: Philament 7 (2005), pp. 1–8. 
 
Dax, Max and Defcon, Robert. /No Beauty Without Danger.

Maeck, Klaus (1997). /Listen With Pain: , 1980-1996 (Paperback). Gestalten Verlag, Berlin, Germany. .
 .
(1993).  (Paperback includes 3" CD). Stampa Alternativa/Materiali Sonori, Italy. .

External links
 
 
 

 
German electronic musicians
German experimental musical groups
German industrial music groups
Musical groups established in 1980
Musical groups from Berlin
Mute Records artists
Nothing Records artists
ROIR artists
Some Bizzare Records artists
Sub Rosa Records artists
Underground, Inc. artists